Hungarian Rhapsody is a 1954 French-German historical musical film directed by Peter Berneis and André Haguet and starring Colette Marchand, Paul Hubschmid and Michel Simon.

Shooting took place at the Victorine Studios in Nice and on location in Paris and the French Riviera. A separate French-language version At the Order of the Czar was also made.

Cast
 Colette Marchand as Carolyne zu Sayn-Wittgenstein
 Paul Hubschmid as Franz Liszt
 Michel Simon as General von Sayn-Wittgenstein
 Willy Fritsch as Großherzog
  as Richard Wagner
 Margot Leonard as Wanda
 Yves Brainville as Dingelstedt
 Jacqueline Gay as Nathalie
 Lucienne Legrand as Maria Pawlowna

References

Bibliography 
 Bock, Hans-Michael & Bergfelder, Tim. The Concise CineGraph. Encyclopedia of German Cinema. Berghahn Books, 2009.

External links 
 

1954 films
French biographical films
French historical musical films
West German films
German historical musical films
German biographical films
1950s biographical films
1950s historical musical films
1950s German-language films
Films set in the 1840s
Films set in the 1850s
Films set in the 1860s
Cultural depictions of Franz Liszt
Biographical films about musicians
Films about classical music and musicians
Films about composers
German multilingual films
French multilingual films
1950s multilingual films
Films directed by André Haguet
Films shot at Victorine Studios
1950s German films
1950s French films